The Stewart House is a historic house at 1406 Summit Street in Little Rock, Arkansas.  It is a -story wood-frame structure, with a distinctive blend of Queen Anne and Colonial Revival styling.  It was built about 1910 to a design by Arkansas architect Charles L. Thompson.  Its asymmetric massing, with a high hipped roof and projecting gables, is typically Queen Anne, as are elements of the front porch.  Its Ionic columns and dentillate cornice are Colonial Revival.

The house was listed on the National Register of Historic Places in 1982.

See also
National Register of Historic Places listings in Little Rock, Arkansas

References

Houses on the National Register of Historic Places in Arkansas
Colonial Revival architecture in Arkansas
Houses completed in 1900
Houses in Little Rock, Arkansas
National Register of Historic Places in Little Rock, Arkansas
Historic district contributing properties in Arkansas